Flinsch Peak is located in the Lewis Range, Glacier National Park in the U.S. state of Montana. Viewed from Oldman Lake, the summit has a distinctive horn shape. Young Man Lake is immediately east of the peak.

See also
 Mountains and mountain ranges of Glacier National Park (U.S.)

References

Mountains of Glacier County, Montana
Mountains of Flathead County, Montana
Mountains of Glacier National Park (U.S.)
Lewis Range
Mountains of Montana